SLR Productions is an Australian company, specialising in the development and production of  children’s content. Established in 2002 by Founder and CEO, Suzanne Ryan, SLR Productions has produced more than 180 hours of content sold in more than 165 countries throughout the world.

Credits

Animation
Deadly (2006)
I Got a Rocket (2006–2007)
Dex Hamilton: Alien Entomologist (2008–2009)
Gasp! (2010–2011)
The DaVincibles (2011–)
Guess How Much I Love You (2011–2017)
Skinner Boys: Guardians of the Lost Secrets (2014–2017)
Teenage Fairytale Dropouts (2012–2013)
Skinner Boys: Guardians of the Lost Secrets (2014–2017)
Captain Flinn and the Pirate Dinosaurs (2015)
Lexi & Lottie: Trusty Twin Detectives (2016–2017)
Alice-Miranda Friends Forever (2019)
Berry Bees (2019–2020)
Space Nova (2021)

Live Action
Sam Fox: Extreme Adventures (2014–2015)

Awards
SLR Productions has been involved in SPAA - Screen Producers Association of Australia since 2004.

SLR Productions have won awards in 22 countries from 2006 to 2020 including a Daytime EMMY®, Australian Export Award, AACTA Award Nomination, ADG Awards, Writers Guild Nominee, Pixie, Grand Prix Golden Kuker, Pulcinella Nominee, ACG, Rockie nominee, ATOM Award and many others, both for programs and for business.

Countries of awards and nominations include: Lebanon, Korea, France, Netherlands, Australia, Bulgaria, Austria, Italy, USA, Singapore, Japan, Canada, Germany, China, Brazil, Belgium, Iran, Russia, Greece, Armenia, Malaysia and Ireland.

See also

List of film production companies
List of television production companies

References

External links

SLR Productions at IMDb